Kapsala is a settlement in Mount Athos, Greece.

Geography
Kapsala is located between Pantokratoros and Stavronikita monasteries. It can be reached from the road that goes to Pantokrator from Karyes. Kapsala can be divided into upper Kapsala (administered by Pantokratoros Monastery), located by the central dividing ridge of the Athonite peninsula, and lower Kapsala, located by the eastern coastline of the peninsula. The less inhabited parts of lower Kapsala are administered by Stavronikita monastery.

Demographics
Kapsala is inhabited by monks living an idiorrhythmic lifestyle in cells (kellia) and huts (kalyvae).

Notable people
Elder Tikhon (Golenkov) of Kapsala (20th century), the spiritual father of St. Paisios the Athonite
Elder Philaret of Kapsala (20th century)

References

Populated places in Mount Athos
Pantokratoros Monastery
Stavronikita Monastery